Bicyclo[1.1.1]pentane is an organic compound, the simplest member of the bicyclic bridged compounds family.  It is a hydrocarbon with formula C5H8. The molecular structure consists of three rings of four carbon atoms each.

Bicyclo[1.1.1]pentane is a highly strained molecule.

Usage 

Kenneth Wiberg and Frederick Walker used bicyclo[1.1.1]pentane to make [1.1.1]propellane.

The bicyclo[1.1.1]pentane structure has been used as an unusual bioisostere for a phenyl ring.

See also
Housane

References

Bicycloalkanes
Cyclobutanes